Mount Gregory is a mountain  high at the south end of Hochstein Ridge in the Queen Elizabeth Range of Antarctica. It is the only large elevation rising from Cotton Plateau. The name was suggested by the Holyoake, Cobham and Queen Elizabeth Ranges Party of the New Zealand Geological Survey Antarctic Expedition, 1964–65, for M. Gregory, a geologist in the party.

References

Mountains of Oates Land
Shackleton Coast